The 2021 Women's National Invitation Tournament was a tournament of 32 NCAA Division I teams that were not selected to participate in the 2021 NCAA Division I women's basketball tournament. The tournament committee announced the 32-team field on March 15, 2021, following the selection of the NCAA Tournament field. The tournament began on March 19, 2021, with the championship game on March 28, 2021. Rice won its first WNIT championship. All games were streamed on FloSports.

Format changes
Changes were made in order to ensure continued viability for the tournament during the COVID-19 pandemic. The field of teams was halved from 64 to 32. Games were not held on-campus; instead there were regional sites. Each conference was not guaranteed an automatic bid as they have been in the past. Teams also were not required to have at least a .500 record.

Participants
The 2021 WNIT field consisted of nine automatic invitations and twenty-three at-large teams. Automatic bids were given to regular season conference champions that did not win their conference tournaments, except for WAC regular season and conference tournament champion California Baptist, since they are still in transition to Division I and are ineligible to participate in the NCAA Women's Tournament until 2023.

Automatic qualifiers

At-large bids

Source:

Bracket
* – Denotes overtime period

Charlotte Regional – Charlotte, North Carolina
Played at Bojangles Coliseum in Charlotte, North Carolina.

Consolation Games

Fort Worth Regional – Fort Worth, Texas
Played at Wilkerson–Greines Activity Center in Fort Worth, Texas.

Consolation Games

Memphis Regional – Collierville, Tennessee
Played at My Town Movers Fieldhouse in Collierville, Tennessee.

Consolation Games

Rockford Regional – Rockford, Illinois
Played at UW Health Sports Factory in Rockford, Illinois.

Consolation Games

Semifinals and Championship Game – Collierville, Tennessee
Played at My Town Movers Fieldhouse in Collierville, Tennessee.

Semifinals
Rice scored the first six points in a semi final game against Delaware, but the blue hens responded to tie up the game at 12 points apiece. Shortly thereafter Rice went on an 11 – 0 run to open up a double-digit lead. Rice held a comfortable lead for most of the game although Delaware cut the lead to seven points in the final minute. Delaware was forced to foul and Rice made the free throws to extend the lead back to double digits, and finished with a 10 point win 85–75. Lauren Schwartz was the leading scorer for Rice with 25 points matched by Jasmine Dickey 25 points for Delaware. Rice hit 54% of their field goal attempts, and did even better beyond the arc hitting nine of 16 for 56%.

In the other semifinal, Mississippi pulled out to a small three point lead 14 – 11 little more than halfway through the first quarter but then held no than Iowa scoreless for about six minutes extending the lead to double digits 22–11. Mississippi continue to lead throughout the game and ending up winning by 10 points 60–50. the wind moved Mississippi into the title game, the first SEC team to advance to the WN night title game since Auburn won the tournament in 2003.

Championship
In the championship game, Rice led most of the game opening up a double-digit lead in the third quarter. in the fourth quarter Rice had a 14 point lead with just over seven minutes to go when Mississippi held Rice scoreless for three minutes and cut the lead to four points 58–54. Rice responded, outscoring the rebels 13–4 in the final four minutes of the game to win their first WNIT championship. Lauren Swarts and Nancy Mulkey each had 19 points for Rice. Shakira Austin had 25 points for Mississippi, the only Rebel player in double-digits.

All-tournament team
 Nancy Mulkey (Rice), MVP
 Lauren Schwartz (Rice)
 Shakira Austin (Ole Miss)
 Donnetta Johnson (Ole Miss)
 Jasmine Dickey (Delaware)
 Kam Finley (Northern Iowa)
Source:

See also
 2021 NCAA Division I women's basketball tournament
 2021 Women's Basketball Invitational
 2021 National Invitation Tournament

Notes

References

External links
 Official website

Women's National Invitation Tournament
Women's National Invitation Tournament
Women's National Invitation Tournament
Women's National Invitation Tournament
Collierville, Tennessee
College basketball tournaments in Tennessee